The 1992–93 Moldovan Cup was the second season of the Moldovan annual football cup competition. The competition ended with the final held on 13 June 1993.

Round of 16

|}

Quarter-finals

|}

Semi-finals

|}

Final

References
 
 

Moldovan Cup seasons
Moldovan Cup
Moldova